Christopher J. Burke is currently a U.S. magistrate judge of the United States District Court for the District of Delaware.

Education
Judge Burke graduated from Georgetown University in 1997 and received his Juris Doctor degree from University of Michigan Law School in 2000.

Career
Upon graduating from law school, Judge Burke served as a judicial law clerk to the Honorable Kenneth Ripple of the U.S. Court of Appeals for the Seventh Circuit from 2000–2001. From 2001–2005, Judge Burke was an Associate in the Washington, D.C. Office of Covington & Burling, where he engaged in pro bono projects such as a six-month appointment at the Children's Law Center. From 2005 to 2011, Judge Burke served as an Assistant U.S. Attorney in the U.S. Attorney's Office for the District of Delaware.

On August 4, 2011, Judge Burke was sworn in as a U.S. Magistrate Judge for the U.S. District Court for the District of Delaware.

Judge Burke is currently the Chairman of the Federal Trial Practice Seminar, a trial skills development program jointly sponsored by the United States District Court for the District of Delaware and the Federal Bar Association’s Delaware Chapter.  Judge Burke also presently presides over the U.S. District Court for the District of Delaware’s criminal Re-entry Court program, which focuses on providing oversight, support and assistance to individuals serving terms of federal supervised release, and helps individuals who are leaving the federal prison system secure jobs and better adjust to being back in society, so they will not recidivate. Jude Burke has also participated in a high school internship program at the District of Delaware Court for at-risk youth, which will provide the student interns with work experience and help them outline a path to college.

Due to being a District of Delaware federal judge and a U.S. Magistrate Judge that assists District Judges Leonard Stark, Gregory Sleet, Richard G. Andrews and Sue Robinson on pre-trial matters, Judge Burke ranks among the top Magistrate Judges that handle the most patent cases. In 2014, Judge Leonard Stark changed the patent practices before him and Judge Burke.

See also
United States District Court for the District of Delaware
United States Court of Appeals for the Second Circuit

References

External links
Magistrate Judge Christopher J. Burke, United States District Court for the District of Delaware

Living people
University of Michigan Law School alumni
Georgetown University alumni
United States magistrate judges
21st-century American judges
Year of birth missing (living people)